The Pick, the Sickle and the Shovel is the second studio album by hip hop supergroup Gravediggaz. Released on September 16, 1997 via Gee Street, V2 and BMG Records, the album has a more socially conscious sound and is considerably calmer than its predecessor; it features heavy production input by the RZA and his production team the Wu Elements.

In contrast to the group's debut album, Prince Paul had less involvement in the production of this album. He did produce the outro and the skit preceding "Hidden Emotions." He was still billed as an official member of the group, however, and appeared on the cover and inserts of the album.

Two singles were released from the album, "Dangerous Mindz" and "The Night the Earth Cried," though neither made it to the Billboard charts.

Critical reception
Spin called the album a "fanciful dystopia," writing that "each rap suggests a creative act of desperation."

Track listing 
Track listing information is taken from the official liner notes.

Notes
 "Fairytalez" features background vocals by Kelis Rogers.
 "What's Goin' On" features background vocals by Blue Raspberry.

Samples
 "Unexplained" contains a sample of "Wild Flower" by New Birth.
 "Fairytalez" contains a sample of "Themes From Montreal Olympics" by The Salsoul Orchestra.
 "Never Gonna Come Back" contains a sample of "Love Serenade" by Barry White.

References

1997 albums
Gravediggaz albums
Gee Street Records albums
V2 Records albums
Albums produced by Prince Paul (producer)
Albums produced by True Master
Albums produced by 4th Disciple